Cornel Gheți (born 23 June 1986) is a Romanian former footballer.

Honours

Club
Milsami Orhei
Moldovan National Division: 2014–15
Moldovan Cup: 2011-12
Moldovan Super Cup: 2012

References

External links

Cornel Gheți profile at milsami.md
Gazetavaii.ro
Data2.7m.cn

1986 births
Living people
People from Luduș
Romanian footballers
Association football midfielders
Liga II players
CSM Câmpia Turzii players
ASA 2013 Târgu Mureș players
ACS Sticla Arieșul Turda players
CSM Jiul Petroșani players
AFC Dacia Unirea Brăila players
Moldovan Super Liga players
FC Milsami Orhei players
Romanian expatriate footballers
Romanian expatriate sportspeople in Moldova
Expatriate footballers in Moldova